Hypancistrus inspector is a species of armored catfish endemic to Venezuela where it occurs in the upper Negro, Casiquiare and upper Orinoco River basins.  This species grows to a length of  SL.

References
 

Ancistrini
Fish of Venezuela
Endemic fauna of Venezuela
Taxa named by Jonathan W. Armbruster
Fish described in 2002